Omroep Brabant is the Netherlands Public Broadcasting regional television and radio broadcaster in the North Brabant Province in the Netherlands. It commenced broadcasting on 1 September 1976.

References

External links
 

Television in the Netherlands